The New England Black Wolves are a lacrosse team based in Uncasville, Connecticut playing in the National Lacrosse League (NLL). The 2017 season will be the team's 3rd season in the league.

Regular season

Current standings

Game log

Playoffs

Roster

Entry Draft
The 2016 NLL Entry Draft took place on September 26, 2016. The Black Wolves made the following selections:

See also
2017 NLL season

References

New England Black Wolves seasons
New England Black Wolves
New England Black Wolves